The Dr. Clay House is a historic house at Walnut and Center Streets in Leslie, Arkansas.  It is a -story, with irregular massing that includes a main block with a hip roof, a projecting front gable, and a rear addition.  A shed-roof porch extends across the front, with turned posts and balustrade in a fanciful Folk Victorian style.  Built in 1907 for a local doctor, it is the city's finest example of this style.

The house was listed on the National Register of Historic Places in 1993.

See also
National Register of Historic Places listings in Searcy County, Arkansas

References

Houses on the National Register of Historic Places in Arkansas
Houses completed in 1907
Houses in Searcy County, Arkansas
National Register of Historic Places in Searcy County, Arkansas